Amphidon is an extinct genus of Late Jurassic mammal from the Morrison Formation. It is present in stratigraphic zone 5. The only species in the genus is Amphidon aequicrurius, found by Simpson in 1925.

See also

 Prehistoric mammal
 List of prehistoric mammals
 Paleobiota of the Morrison Formation

References

 Foster, J. (2007). Jurassic West: The Dinosaurs of the Morrison Formation and Their World. Indiana University Press. 389pp.

Morrison mammals
Eutriconodonts
Taxa named by George Gaylord Simpson
Prehistoric mammal genera